Michael Rush Lerner is a dermatologist in San Diego, California.

Lerner was born in Portland, Oregon.

He discovered snRNPs with Joan A. Steitz, STEP (with Paul Lombroso), created the melanophore based GPCR bioassay and demonstrated that Smoothened is a GPCR.

References

Year of birth missing (living people)
Living people
Physicians from Portland, Oregon
People from San Diego
American dermatologists